Hotel Victoria may refer to:

 Hotel Victoria (New York City)
 Hotel Victoria (Toronto)